The Gissaro-Alai open woodlands ecoregion (WWF ID: PA0808) covers the western foothills winding around two western offshoots of the Tian Shan Mountains in western Tajikistan, and parts of eastern Uzbekistan and western Kyrgyzstan, in Central Asia. The woodlands are typically of Juniper trees and shrubs, fitting the altitude zone situated between the desert valley floor (mostly on the west), and the tree line, above which the mountain ridges are glaciated and barren.

Location and description 
The ecoregion winds its way around two chains of mountain ranges that extend westward from the Tian Shan Mountains. The northern chain is a direct extension of the Tian Shan, the southern chain is composed of (from west to east) the Gissar Range, the Zarafshan Range, the Turkestan Range, and the Alay Range.  Collectively the southern chain has been referred to as the Pamir-Alay. In between the two mountain chains is the Fergana Valley.  To the east are the Pamir Mountains. The snow line is lowest in the west (and highest in the east.  

The higher elevations in the Pamir-Alay are in the Pamir alpine desert and tundra ecoregion, and heavily glaciated.  To the west, and at lower elevations, is the Alai-Western Tian Shan steppe ecoregion.

Climate 
The driest month between April and September does not have more than 30 millimeters of precipitation.

Flora and fauna 
Flora communities reflect altitude zones.  Below 1800-2000 meters the desert foothills are characterized by sagebrush (Artemisia), bulbous bluegrass (Poa bulbosa), and sedges (Carex pachystilis). At higher elevations are meadows and grasslands dominated by fescues (Festuca alaica). Junipers (Juniperus seravschanica, Juniperus turkestanica, and J. semiglobosa), wild fruit trees (cherry, pears, apples) and nut trees (almonds, pistachios) grow along with steppe grasses and shrubs of Cotoneaster, rose, and honeysuckle (Lonicera).

Protections
Significant protected areas in the ecoregion include:
 Sayram-Ugam National Park
 Köýtendag Nature Reserve
 Zaamin National Park
 Ramit State Nature Reserve

References 

Palearctic ecoregions
Ecoregions of Tajikistan
Ecoregions of Kazakhstan
Ecoregions of Uzbekistan
Ecoregions of Kyrgyzstan
Temperate grasslands, savannas, and shrublands